indicates a color difference signal between Red (R) and a Luminance component, as part of a Luminance (Y) and Chrominance (C) color model. 
It has different meanings depending on the exact model used:
V  in YUV, a generic model used for analog and digital image formats;
Cr in YCbCr, used for digital images and video;
Pr in YPbPr, used in analog component video;
Dr in YDbDr, used in analog SECAM and PAL-N;

See also
B-Y